Dendrolimus spectabilis, the pine moth or matsugahera in Japan, is a moth in the family Lasiocampidae.

Distribution
It is found in Japan.

Host plants and damage
The Japanese straw mats named komomaki were created to protect pine trees from the moth.

References

Lasiocampidae
Moths described in 1877
Moths of Japan